Christmas After Midnight is the first Christmas album, and sixth studio album, by American recording artist Fantasia. It was released by Concord Records on October 6, 2017, in the United States, serving as the singer's debut release with the label after departing from RCA soon after releasing her previous album, The Definition Of... (2016). Chiefly produced by frequent collaborator Ron Fair, the album was recorded in Los Angeles and Nashville, compromising a festive mix of renditions of Fantasia's favorite rock, soul, jazz, funk, and blues holiday classics. Upon its release, the album debuted at number five on Billboards Top Holiday Albums chart.

Track listing

Charts

References

External links
Official website

2017 Christmas albums
Fantasia Barrino albums
Concord Records albums
Christmas albums by American artists
Contemporary R&B Christmas albums